German submarine Hai, the former U-2365 Type XXIII U-boat of Nazi Germany's Kriegsmarine during World War II, was one of the first submarines of the Bundesmarine. She was ordered on 20 September 1944, and was laid down on 6 December 1944 at Deutsche Werft AG, Hamburg, as yard number 519. She was launched on 26 January 1945 and commissioned under the command of Oberleutnant zur See Fritz-Otto Korfmann on 2 March 1945. Scuttled on 8 May 1945, the boat was raised in June 1956 and commissioned into the newly founded Bundesmarine as Hai, where she served until she sank by accident on 14 September 1966.

Design
Like all Type XXIII U-boats, U-2365 had a displacement of  when at the surface and  while submerged. The submarine was powered by one MWM six-cylinder RS134S diesel engine providing , one AEG GU4463-8 double-acting electric motor electric motor providing , and one BBC silent running CCR188 electric motor providing .

U-2365 was fitted with two  torpedo tubes in the bow. She could carry two preloaded torpedoes. The complement was 14 – 18 men. This class of U-boat did not carry a deck gun.

Service history
On 8 May 1945, U-2365 was scuttled northwest of Anholt in the Kattegat as part of Operation Regenbogen.

Post war service
In June 1956, U-2365 was raised by the German Federal Navy and commissioned Hai on 15 August 1957. On 14 September 1966, she foundered on Dogger Bank in the North Sea during a gale. Nineteen of the twenty crewmen were lost, making this one of the worst peacetime naval disasters in German history.

See also
 Battle of the Atlantic

References

Bibliography

External links

U-boats commissioned in 1945
World War II submarines of Germany
1945 ships
Type XXIII submarines
Ships built in Hamburg
Operation Regenbogen (U-boat)
Maritime incidents in May 1945
Maritime incidents in 1966
Lost submarines of Germany
Shipwrecks in the Kattegat
Shipwrecks in the North Sea